Saragossa or Zaragoza is a city in Spain.

Saragossa may also refer to:

Places
 Saragossa, Alabama
 Saragossa (Natchez, Mississippi), listed on the U.S. National Register of Historic Places
 , a Medieval Catalan exonym for Syracuse, Sicily, Italy.

People
 Valerius of Saragossa (died 315 AD)
 Vincent of Saragossa (died 304 AD)
 José de Palafox y Melzi, Duke of Saragossa (1780–1847)

Events
 Councils of Saragossa, councils of the Church in 380, 592, and 691 
 Battle of Saragossa, a battle in 1710 of the War of the Spanish Succession

Other uses
 Saragossa (moth), a moth genus
 Saragossa Opening, an opening in the game of chess

See also
 
 Zaragoza (disambiguation)
 Sargasso (disambiguation)
 Saragosa (disambiguation)